Bay View is the name of some places in the US state of Wisconsin:
Bay View, Kewaunee County, Wisconsin, an unincorporated community in Kewaunee County
Bay View, Milwaukee, a neighborhood of Milwaukee

See also
Bayview, Wisconsin, a town